SBSI may refer to:

SBS independent, film and television production company, linked to Special Broadcasting Service public broadcasting network, Australia
Confederation of Indonesia Prosperous Trade Union (Serikat Buruh Sejahtera Indonesia), a trade union federation from Indonesia
SBSI – Surface Based Body Shape Index. A new method to replace Body mass index.